Cafe Wha? is a music club at the corner of MacDougal Street and Minetta Lane in the Greenwich Village neighborhood of Manhattan, New York City. The club is important in the history of rock and folk music, having presented numerous musicians and comedians early on in their careers, including Bob Dylan, Jimi Hendrix, Bruce Springsteen, The Velvet Underground, Cat Mother & the All Night Newsboys, Kool & the Gang, Peter, Paul and Mary, Woody Allen, Lenny Bruce, Joan Rivers, Bill Cosby, and Richard Pryor.

The club's motto is "Greenwich Village’s Swingingest Coffee House".

History

Cafe Wha? was opened in 1959 by Manny Roth, an actor and World War II veteran, at 115 MacDougal Street in New York City. Entered down a steep staircase, the basement space was formerly a horse stable, and Roth laid the marble tile himself. He painted the walls black to make the space seem like a cave. The club was a coffeeshop selling food and drinks, and eventually charged a cover for entry. Musicians, comedians, and performers of all types played throughout the afternoon and evening, frequently being paid through baskets passed amongst the audience. The space had a capacity of 325 people. Describing Cafe Wha? in his memoir, Chronicles: Volume One, Bob Dylan wrote that it was "a subterranean cavern, liquorless, ill lit, low ceiling, like a wide dining room with chairs and tables."

In 1968, Roth stopped running Cafe Wha?, and it was taken over by Menachem "Manny" Dworman, who ran the Cafe Feenjon in the location until 1987. The Feenjon featured Israeli and Middle Eastern music.

In 1986, Menachem Dworman's son, Noam, had introduced to the Feenjon the concept of a rock music house band made up of the most talented performers in the area. The band performed for a year at the Cafe Feenjon on Wednesdays and Sundays, quickly becoming so popular that they took over the entire week. In 1987, the club was taken over by Noam, who changed the room back to a rock music format, and changed the name back to Cafe Wha?

The Cafe Wha? house band plays dynamic, high-energy versions of popular songs, and encourages an informal atmosphere between the stage and audience.

In 1997, Cafe Wha? opened Brazil Night on Mondays, a show created and produced by Andre Alves. The show was performed for over five years to a sold-out crowd, receiving positive acclaim.

Notable artists 
Bob Dylan first performed at Cafe Wha? during a "hootenany" night on January 24, 1961 after hitchhiking across the country. He continued playing at the club as a backup harmonica player during the afternoon.

Before she was part of the folk trio Peter, Paul, and Mary, Mary Travers was a waitress at Cafe Wha?

Based on the recommendation of folk singer Richie Havens, Roth hired Jimi Hendrix as a recurring performer in 1966. Billed as "Jimmy James and the Blue Flames", he played five sets a night, six nights a week. Chas Chandler, the bassist for The Animals, discovered Hendrix at Cafe Wha? and brought him to England to promote his career.

In 1967, Bruce Springsteen's band, The Castiles, played afternoon sets for two months.

Van Halen singer David Lee Roth is the nephew of Manny Roth, and he and Van Halen performed at Cafe Wha? in 2012.

Notable comedians who performed at the club early in their careers include Woody Allen, Lenny Bruce, Joan Rivers, Bill Cosby, and Richard Pryor.

See also
The Gaslight Cafe
Cafe Au Go Go
Live at The Cafe Au Go Go
Gerde's Folk City
The Bitter End

References

External links 
 
 

Nightclubs in Manhattan
Drinking establishments in Greenwich Village
West Village
Greenwich Village